Jaakko Kolmonen (May 2, 1941 – September 3, 2016) was a Finnish chef. He worked since 1962 as a cooking teacher in several vocational schools and was known for his many television cooking-themed programs on YLE TV2 such as Asia on pihvi (aired 1971–1973) and Patakakkonen (first aired in 1977).

In 1991 he was awarded the Finnish Lion's Order of Merit and the National "tiedonjulkistamispalkinto" in 1988. Jaakko Kolmonen was also active in the Finnish Chef Association.

Books 
 Kotomaamme ruoka-aitta: Suomen, Karjalan ja Petsamon pitäjäruoat
 Kokin niksikirja
 Mitä minä syön

References

External links

1941 births
2016 deaths
Finnish chefs
Finnish television chefs
Crosses of Merit of the Order of the Lion of Finland
People from Juankoski
Finnish food writers